Eşfak Aykaç (1918–2003) was a Turkish former football player and coach. He only played for Galatasaray SK (1936–1946) and after his career he coached the club.

He was named coach of the national team for one match, the match against the legendary Hungarian team, created by Gusztáv Sebes, which he won 3-1.

See also
List of one-club men

References

Turkish footballers
Turkish football managers
Galatasaray S.K. (football) managers
Galatasaray S.K. footballers
Süper Lig managers
1918 births
2003 deaths
Burials at Zincirlikuyu Cemetery
Association footballers not categorized by position